Quercus chevalieri is an uncommon species of tree in the beech family Fagaceae. It has been found in Vietnam and also in  southern China, in the Provinces of Guangdong, Guangxi, and Yunnan.  It is placed in subgenus Cerris, section Cyclobalanopsis.

Quercus chevalieri is a tree up to 20 m. tall with leaves as much as 110 mm long.  The acorn is ovoid to oblong-ellipsoid, 10-15 (sometimes 20) × 6-8 (sometimes 15) mm, glabrous; the scar is approx. 5 mm in diameter.

Some authors have misapplied this name to another plant, Cyclobalanopsis augustinii var. nigrinux (H.H. Hu) M. Deng & Z.K. Zhou.

References

External links
line drawings, Flora of China Illustrations vol. 4, fig. 384, drawings 3 + 4 at lower right

chevalieri
Flora of Vietnam
Flora of Indo-China
Trees of Vietnam
Flora of China
Plants described in 1921
Taxa named by Aimée Antoinette Camus